Franz Ignaz von Beecke (28 October 1733 – 2 January 1803) was a classical music composer born in Wimpfen am Neckar, Germany.

Life
Von Beecke served in the Bavarian Dragoon Regiment of Zollern from 1756, during which time he fought in the Seven Years' War. He served with distinction and was promoted to Captain.  He was known at the time chiefly for his great skill in playing the harpsichord, although he composed a wide range of music as well, having studied with Christoph Willibald Gluck. He died in Wallerstein, Germany.

In 1775, von Beecke met the 19-year-old Wolfgang Amadeus Mozart in Munich and the two engaged in a piano playing competition at the well-known inn Zum Schwarzen Adler. The poet and composer Christian Friedrich Daniel Schubart, who was in the audience, wrote in his Teutsche Chronik (27 April 1775) that in his opinion, von Beecke played far better than Mozart: "In Munich last winter I heard two of the greatest clavier players, Mr Mozart and Captain von Beecke. Mozart’s playing had great weight, and he read at sight everything that we put before him. But no more than that; Beecke surpasses him by a long way. Winged agility, grace and melting sweetness."

Selected works

Stage works
 Roland (opera) - 1770?
 Claudine from Villa Bella (singspiel in one act with libretto by Goethe) - 1780
 The jubilee wedding (comic opera in 3 acts with libretto by Weiße) - 1782
 The grape harvest (singspiel in 2 acts) - 1782
 List against List (The Bell) (singspiel) - c.1785
 The heart retains its rights (singspiel) - 1790
 The destroyed pastoral celebration (pastoral) - 1790
 Nina (singspiel) - 1790

Instrumental music
 33 symphonies
 1 sinfonia concertante
 Several piano concertos
 Piano quintet in A minor
 17 string quartets
 6 flute quartets
 Numerous works for piano

References

External links
 

German Classical-period composers
German male classical composers
1733 births
1803 deaths
19th-century German male musicians